Ronald Martin (born 17 January 1953) is a British businessman, chief executive of Martin Dawn PLC, an Essex, United Kingdom-based property development company. Since 2000, he has been the chairman of Southend United Football Club.

Sports career

Some reports say Martin was a member of the Great Britain 1980 Winter Olympics bobsleigh team - a claim Martin made in a local newspaper interview in February 2000. In 2009, the East London and West Essex Guardian reported that in the 1970s he "was on-standby to join the Great Britain bobsleigh team. The call never came".

Business career
A construction and property development business, Martin Dawn (Essex) Limited was incorporated on 3 November 1983 with Ron Martin named as one of its directors. The company changed its name to Martin-Dawn Ltd on 12 February 1987, and became Martin Dawn plc on 6 February 1995.

Southend United 
Martin Dawn PLC and Delancey Estates, together forming South Eastern Leisure (SEL), took control of Southend United in November 1998, buying the club and its centrally located Roots Hall ground for £4m from then chairman Vic Jobson, who at the time owned 55% of the issued share capital of the club. Jobson had previously sold part of the ground's South Bank for housing, and SEL's plan was to continue the redevelopment and move the club to a proposed 16,000-seat stadium in a leisure redevelopment in the northern part of Southend.

John Main replaced Jobson as Southend United chairman, but was uneasy about the club having to pay £400,000 annual rent to its new owners, and about Ron Martin's motives ("How can he argue for the club, particularly against SEL, if he jointly owns SEL and his main interest is in making money from the property deal?"). Two years later, in September 2000, Main was ousted as a condition of a £1.5m investment by Delancy Estates, and replaced by Martin.

In September 2001 it was claimed that Southend United could remain at Roots Hall after a deal was proposed between property developers Lansbury and Delancey. Negotiations continued into 2002, with a deal announced in December 2002, allowing the club to remain at Roots Hall for three years while plans for Fossetts Farm were developed.

In March 2006, Martin bought out Delancy's shareholding in Southend United, and planned a new Council submission about a combined 17,000-seat stadium, retail and leisure development at Fossett's Farm. On 3 August 2006 local media reported that work was to start in 2007 on a £25 million 22,000 super-stadium. Martin stated that "plans are at an advanced stage now" and added that they would be submitted in late September 2006 after which there will be a 16-week public consultation. The new ground has been designed by Populous, formerly known as HOK Sport.

In January 2007, Southend Borough Council gave planning permission for a new 22,000-seater stadium at the proposed Fossetts Farm site, with Rochford District Council following suit 24 hours later. On 6 March 2008, permission to develop Fossetts Farm was given by the government. However, it took a further 12 years before firm plans emerged for the development; in April 2020, a deal was agreed between Southend United, the borough council and social housing provider Citizen Housing. Established in 2018, Citizen is a joint venture between Lenrose Housing and Allied Commercial Exporters, the UK investment vehicle of property tycoons, the Dellal family; it is fronted by Ron Martin's son, Jack Martin. Plans approved in October 2021 included a 22,000-capacity stadium with a 107-bed hotel and high-rise residential blocks of 182 homes on two corners, but the hotel plan was later dropped and the proposed stadium capacity was reduced to 16,226 seats.

Financial troubles 
During the 2009–10 season, Southend faced two winding-up orders from HM Revenue and Customs over unpaid tax bills. In February 2010 Southend players were not paid, the Professional Footballers Association had to pay the players, and the club were placed under a transfer embargo until they paid the money back. In March 2010 Southend were given a 35-day extension to pay the unpaid bill or face administration, and further seven day extension in April 2010. On 20 April 2010 the bill was paid, and in August 2010 all actions against Southend United were dropped and an agreement was reached with HMRC.

It later emerged that Martin had re-mortgaged his home to stop the club going bust, borrowing £750,000 against his £1.6m home in Benfleet, to help clear a £338,000 tax debt and stop the club being forced into administration. The 2010 bailout was part of a total of around £13.5m of his own or borrowed money that Martin had ploughed into the club since 1999. According to the club's 2012 accounts, the club was effectively insolvent, but remained a "going concern" thanks to support from Martin Dawn Plc and South Eastern Leisure. Martin had also faced legal action from individuals and firms (including solicitors, a neuro specialist and Anglian Water) to settle bills, and in 2013 agreed a repayment plan with former club chief executive Tara Brady over a £150,000 debt.

Later financial difficulties resulted in non-payment of players' and other employees' wages in December 2019, after which players consulted with the PFA. Martin paid £140,000 after seven senior players did not receive their December 2019 wages on time, and met with all players to reassure them it would not happen again. The winding-up petition was dismissed after debts were cleared, but continued financial constraints prevented the club signing any new players during the January 2020 transfer window. On 2 March, Martin confirmed Southend was under an EFL transfer embargo due to an unpaid tax bill, while February's wages to players were not paid on time, resulting in further PFA involvement. On 9 March, Southend was charged with misconduct by the EFL for failing to pay players on time, and for fielding an ineligible player (on 2 June, Southend received a suspended three-point penalty and were fined £7,500 for these offences). On 11 March, a further HMRC winding-up petition was adjourned to 29 April; it was then adjourned three more times, eventually to 28 October 2020, when the club finally settled tax debts of £493,931 with HMRC; as a result, a winding-up petition was dismissed by the High Court. Meanwhile, on 2 April 2020, during the COVID-19 pandemic in the United Kingdom, Southend put "several staff and some players" on furlough (temporary leave) under the UK Government's emergency job retention scheme. Martin said "It enables the club to best manage its finances during this time of limited income", but the move was criticised by the PFA who said the club had "consistently" let players down over wages.

In April 2021, former Southend player Stan Collymore wrote to Martin offering to buy the club from him, and held talks concerning the potential appointment of a Collymore associate as the club's CEO.

Relegation from Football League 
Under Martin's chairmanship Southend suffered a second successive relegation on 1 May 2021, dropping out of the Football League after 101 years. Supporters demonstrated and called for his resignation, but he said: "the future will be great again". He also suggested League Two relegation was "unfair" as the National League had suspended relegation for the COVID-19-affected season, and submitted proposals for EFL consideration.

Continued financial troubles
In August 2021, Southend revealed its overall debt in July 2019 was £17.4m, having grown by £2.4m; Martin said the majority of the debt was owed to his companies, and that £6.8m of debt had already been written off. With the club struggling near the foot of the National League, Southend fans staged protests on 5 and 9 October 2021 at Roots Hall demanding Martin's departure. Collymore offered further free support to the club, described as "a mess" by the BBC:
"The club is a mess, with the chairman pushing on with his plans for a new stadium while Roots Hall slowly falls into a dilapidated state. With the club already on life support, emergency surgery is the order of the day if it is not to sink further."

On 30 September 2022, the club was placed under a transfer embargo after a missed payment to HMRC; the following day, fans staged protests at Roots Hall after shirt sponsors PG Site Services withdraw their club support. Fans group Save Our Southend blamed "the utter ineptitude of Ron Martin in running the club properly," saying they judged him "to be an unfit and improper owner". In a statement, Martin blamed a programme delay for a missed payment under the club's Time To Pay Agreement with HMRC, which he said HMRC then cancelled prematurely. He said bridging finance would enable the club to discharge its HMRC debt in full. Nonetheless, in October 2022, HMRC issued a winding-up petition - due to be heard at the High Court on 9 November, it was adjourned to 18 January 2023.

With the club's final accounts for the year to 31 July 2020 still not filed (overdue since April 2021), on 3 January 2023, Companies House issued a first Gazette notice to have the company struck off. On 18 January 2023, the HMRC winding up hearing was adjourned again, until 1 March 2023. In a 25 January 2023 statement, Martin could not "outline precise timings" regarding the bridging finance to be applied against the "large" HMRC debt; Martin was later reported to be seeking a £5m loan to pay debts including £1.4m in unpaid tax owed to HMRC. The Shrimpers Trust did not expect the club to make a loan repayment due at the start of February, and, with players and other staff unpaid for January, anxious fans started planning a 'phoenix club' and there were unsuccessful attempts to engage with Martin over a possible sale of the club.

On 10 February 2023, St John Ambulance said it would no longer provide first aid staff at Southend United home games because of outstanding fees, forcing the club to find alternative medical cover ahead of an FA Trophy tie with York City. The following day, Martin said finding the money to clear the club's HMRC debt by 1 March "will be close" but he "will not let the club be wound-up". He described the debt as a legacy of unpaid PAYE for players' wages from when Southend was in Leagues One and Two. Martin said: "Raising the funds is my primary focus. We are advanced but not there yet. Times are tough but I'm not a magician. However, if we get past this current trauma, the future for the club is bright." Players' January wages remained unpaid ahead of Southend's 25 February game at Torquay United, and were eventually paid 28 days late while other staff had not been paid since November. Less than 24 hours before the winding-up hearing, the club said it had paid the £1.4m tax bill, adding that "funds as working capital" had also been injected into the club. After a brief hearing at the Insolvency and Companies Court on 1 March 2023, the winding-up petition was dismissed after HMRC confirmed the debt had been paid. However, the transfer embargo remained in place; sponsors, angry at being kept in the dark, talked of taking legal action against the club; and supporters groups, fearing "the next crisis could be just around the corner", highlighted the "owner's inadequacies" and said a new beginning would only be possible "when a new structure and ownership is in place at the club".

Fraud investigation
In 2007, Martin's home and offices were searched and he was later arrested during a fraud investigation concerning a planning application unrelated to his football club interests. He helped with police enquiries and was not charged with any offences.

References

1953 births
Living people
English businesspeople
English football chairmen and investors